The National Camogie League, known for sponsorship reasons as the Very Ireland Camogie Leagues, is a competition in the Irish team sport of camogie, played exclusively by women. The competition is held in three divisions graded by ability.
It was first played in 1976 for a trophy donated by Allied Irish Banks when Tipperary beat Wexford in a replayed final. Division Two (originally the National Junior League) was inaugurated in 1979 and won by Kildare.

The first two National League competitions started in the autumn and finished in the spring of 1976–77 and 1977–78 respectively. Since then the competition has been completed within the calendar year. The 2001 final was not played until October because of the foot-and-mouth disease outbreak earlier in the year. From 1980 to 2005 the National League was divided into two sections – Senior and Junior. Reserve teams from the leading counties were allowed enter the Junior League after 1982. The current structure with Divisions 1, 2, 3, 4 was introduced in 2006. A one-day blitz competition for fifth tier counties, Division 5, was organised in 2008 and 2009. The second division was known for a period as Division 1B and the third Division was Division 2, they have been reallocated for reasons of consistency in the records below.

The current holders are Galway who defeated Cork in the 2022 final.

Roll of honour

Tournament unfinished in 2020.

National Camogie League Finals
Click on the year for details and team line-outs from each individual competition.
The first figure is the number of goals scored (equal to 3 points each) and the second total is the number of points scored, the figures are combined to determine the winner of a match in Gaelic Games

Lower division finals

Junior National League / Division 2
Dublin All-Ireland medal-holder, Eileen Bourke presented Corn de Búrca for the Junior National League in memory of her sister, Joan who served as secretary of Leinster Colleges Council.

1980 Armagh 2-05 Kildare 2-03
1981 Cavan 2-04 Louth 1-07
 Replay Cavan 0-04 Louth 0-02
1982 Dublin 6-09 Tyrone 0-02
1983 Dublin 3-09 Westmeath 2-05
1984 Dublin 2-04 Armagh 1-03
1985 Galway 3-10 Kildare 3-03
1986 Kildare 2-03 Dublin 1-04
1987 Dublin 6-04 Kildare 1-07
1988 Armagh 1-09 Down 0-06
1989 Kildare 2-14 Armagh 3-08
1990 Kildare 2-13 Kilkenny 1-03
1991 Limerick 3-13 Roscommon 3-04
1992 Limerick 4-13 Down 2-06
1993 Armagh 3-08 Dublin 2-01
1994 Armagh 1-18 Cork 1-02
1995 Galway 4-13 Down 2-09
1996 Limerick 5-10 Down 3-07
1997 Antrim 5-12 Down 3-16
1998 Down 0-20 Cork 0-12
1999 Derry 3-07 Wexford 0-07
2000 Cork 3-09 Laois 1-05
2001 Cork 3-14 Derry 4-03
2002 Offaly 3-18 Laois 2-6
 2003 Galway 2-10 Armagh 1-08
 2004 Kildare 2-11 Laois 2-06
 2005 Cork 2-10 Galway 2-07
 2006 Kilkenny 2-08 Dublin 2-07
 2007 Limerick 1-14 Cork 0-05
 2008 Clare 4-08 Derry 3-09
 2009 Wexford 2-09 Antrim 0-11
 2010 Wexford 2-09 Offaly 1-09
 2011 Waterford 0-16 Antrim 2-09
 2012 Derry 2-11 Meath 0-06
 2013 Limerick 3-14 Kildare 0-10
 2014 Cork 2-12 Down 2-06
 2015 Waterford 3-10 Laois 2-05
 2016 Meath 1-10 Galway 2-03
 2017 Cork "B" 2-16 Derry 1-05
 2018 Cork "B" 0-08 Westmeath 1-04
 2019 Tipperary 0-14 Kilkenny 0-08
 2020 Abandoned
 2021 Down 3-08 Antrim 1-11
 2022 Wexford 3-12 Antrim 0-14

Division 3 

2006 Clare 1-14 Derry 3-07
2007 Waterford 1-18 Down 2-13
2008 Antrim 1-10 Offaly 1-10
Replay Antrim 6-11 Offaly 3-07
2009 Down 0-15 Laois 2-08
2010 Laois 2-10 Meath 2-05
2011 Meath 3-09 Kildare 2-11
 2012 Kildare 1-08 Armagh 0-10
 2013 Laois 0-09 Dublin 0-07
 2014 Westmeath beat Dublin
 2015 Carlow 0-12 Dublin 1-07
 2016 Armagh 3-11 Roscommon 2-09 
 2017 Dublin "B" 0-12 Roscommon 0-07
 2018Kerry 2-08 Roscommon 0-04 
 2019  Kildare 2-09 Limerick 0-11
 2020 Abandoned
 2021 Wexford 0-13 Armagh 1-08
 2022 Cavan 2-05 Wexford 0-09

Division 4 

 2008 Meath 5-07 Roscommon 1-05
 2009 Kildare 3-07 Westmeath 1-10
 2010 Tyrone 3-12 Westmeath 1-09
 2011 Westmeath 4-06 Cavan 2-07
 2012 Dublin 1-06 Carlow 0-05
 2013 Carlow 2-06 Tyrone 2-04
 2014 Limerick
 2015Kerry 1-12 Meath 1-04
 2021 Cavan 3-16 Roscommon 0-07
 2022 Mayo 2-14  Wicklow 1-06

Division 5 
Division 5 was run as a one-day blitz competition. It was discontinued in 2010 with the introduction of a championship structure for the
All Ireland Junior B grade (Máire Ní Chinnéide Cup).

 2006 Monaghan
 2007 Monaghan
 2008 Tyrone 2-04 Cavan 1-03
 2009 Wicklow 2-07 Monaghan 1-01

References

 
Camogie competitions
Cam